Behilpur is a village in Gujrat District, Punjab, Pakistan. Situated near Jalalpur Jattan. It distance from Gujrat city is almost 22 kilometers.

Location
Behil Pur is situated in the District Gujrat city, and also near Jalalpur Jattan.

Climate
The Village has a moderate climate. During the winter, the minimum temperature may fall below .

References 

Populated places in Gujrat District